Louis Mussington is a French politician from Rassemblement Saint-Martinois who is the President-elect of Saint Martin since the 2022 election.

References 

Living people
Presidents of the Territorial Council of Saint Martin
21st-century French politicians
Year of birth missing (living people)